Konodimini is a village and rural commune in the Cercle of Ségou in the Ségou Region of southern-central Mali. The commune includes 23 villages in an area of approximately 362 square kilometers. In the 2009 census it had a population of 16719. The village of Konodimini, the chef-lieu of the commune, lies 23 km southwest of Ségou, on the right (south) bank of the Niger River.

References

External links
.

Communes of Ségou Region